Chut Pyin is a village in the Rathedaung Township of Rakhine State, Myanmar. It is the site of an alleged massacre by the Myanmar Army, carried out against Rohingyas in the village on 26 August 2017.

References 

Populated places in Rakhine State

my:ချွတ်ပြင်ရွာ